Diana Danielle Danny Beeson (born 22 November 1991), is an American-born Malaysian actress and singer. Starting her career at the age of 11, she primarily worked on television and film.

Early life
Diana Danielle was born in Houston, Texas and raised in Malaysia. Her mother is Malaysian and her father is American. She was raised by her mother.

Career
Danielle holds a high-profile acting career and she is in demand for a variety of jobs such as modeling, singing and appearing in commercials. She debuted in the acting world by chance. Actor Norman Hakim discovered Danielle when he went to visit her family when she was 9. She took up the offer and had a supporting role in Aziz M. Osman Idola alongside Norman who played her father. Danielle rose to fame after her debut role in local TV3 television series Air Mata Maria. She was only 14 at that time when she was given a role that is 20 years of age.

On the public front, Danielle stays close to her fans on Facebook with regular updates (in Malay and English) about her career developments and more. She has over 1.1 million fans (and counting) following her on Facebook.

Danielle recently moved to Australia early 2013 to pursue her studies in fine arts. She is a student at The National Institute of Dramatic Art in Sydney, Australia.

Personal life
She married Malaysian actor Farid Kamil in 2012. They have two children together, namely Muhammad and Nur Aurora.

Filmography

Film

Television series

Telemovie

Television

Discography

Endorsements
 Fiorucci
 Volvo
 Watson's
 Pampers
 Shuemura
 Milo
 Hazeline Snow Vietnam Market
 Telecom I-talk
 Harian Metro
 Avon for Wish Parfume
 Fair and Lovely
 Bauch and Lomb contact lens
 Kentucky Fried Chicken
 Binary Body Scrub
 T3 Body Wash
 F&N Soya Bean
 Rafflesia Pearl
 Jeteine Hair Colour
 Tan & Tan Corporate Websites
 Tenaga Nasional
 Inner Shine for Brands
 Tuala wanita pakai buang
 Nanowhite
 Tongkat Ali

Awards and nominations

Notes

References

External links

Diana Danielle profile at Sinema Malaysia

Living people
American people of Malay descent
Malaysian people of Malay descent
American Muslims
Actresses from Houston
People from Penang
Malaysian actresses
Malaysian television personalities
1991 births
Malaysian people of American descent
Malaysian Muslims
Citizens of Malaysia through descent
American emigrants to Malaysia